Thomas Hogg may refer to:

 Thomas Hogg (sodomy defendant) (fl. 1647), man accused of fathering piglets
 Thomas Jefferson Hogg (1792–1862), British biographer
 Thomas Hogg (MR&LE) (1808–1881), English-born chief mechanical engineer for the Mad River and Lake Erie Railroad, the first railroad in Ohio
 Thomas Egenton Hogg (1828–1898), Confederate naval officer and Oregon railroad promoter
 Thomas Elisha Hogg (1842–1880), teacher, lawyer, and educator, brother of Jim Hogg and uncle of Ima Hogg
 Tommy Hogg (1908–1965), English footballer, played for Bradford Park Avenue and Rochdale
 Tomás Hogg (1843–1920), co-founder of Buenos Aires Football Club, and cricketer

See also
 Thomas Hog of Kiltearn (1628–1692), controversial 17th century Scottish minister